Batuan is a historic township in the north of Chaling County, Hunan, China. As a historic division of Chaling, Batuan Commune was created in 1961 from part of Huotian Commune.  The commune was reorganized as a township in 1984. On November 20, 2015, Batuan Township was merged to Huotian Town.

Subdivisions
The township is divided into 14 villages, the following areas: Baishi Community, Wolong Village, Peijiang Village, Daying Village, Xiaoying Village, Donghuang Village, Dongping Village, Shigu Village, Xiangyang Village, Dalong Village, Daping Village, Meizhuang Village, Tilong Village, and Jiangdong Village.

References

Historic township-level divisions of Chaling County